Bombay Castle is a fort in Mumbai (formerly Bombay)

Bombay Castle may also refer to:
 , a third-rate ship of the Royal Navy that was wrecked in 1796
 , an East Indiaman that was at the action of 4 August 1800 and the Battle of Pulo Aura (1804)
 Bombay Castle (South China Sea), a shoal in the southern Spratly Islands